Hockey Calgary is the governing body for ice hockey in the city of Calgary, Alberta, Canada at the Junior "B", Junior "C", and Minor levels. The organization is a subsection of Hockey Alberta and Hockey Canada.

Associations
The following community associations are member associations of Hockey Calgary:
Blackfoot (serving the southeast)
Bow River Bruins (serving the northwest)
Bow Valley (serving the southeast)
Crowfoot (serving the northwest)
Glenlake Hawks (serving the majority of the southwest)

Knights Hockey Club (Midnapore/Lake Bonavista Merge) (Serving Northeast/southeast)  
Midnapore Mavericks (serving the southeast)
Northwest Warriors (serving the majority of the northwest)
Saints (serving the northeast)
Simons Valley (serving the northwest)
Southwest (merger between Southland and Shaw Meadows - serving the southwest)
Springbank (serving areas just outside city limits)
Trails West Wolves (serving the southwest)

Calgary Junior Hockey League

The Calgary Junior Hockey League is a Junior "B" league.  The league competes against the different Junior "B" leagues in Alberta for the Alberta Provincial Junior B Hockey Championship.  The winner of the provincial will compete against the champions of the British Columbia Amateur Hockey Association, Hockey Saskatchewan, Hockey Manitoba, and Hockey Northwestern Ontario for the Keystone Cup—the Western Canadian Jr. B Crown.

Calgary Junior C Hockey League
The Calgary Junior "C" League is run out of the different city centres in Calgary. The champion and two runners-up compete against the top three teams of the Noralta Junior Hockey League for the Provincial Junior "C" title.

Teams
 Airdrie Dragons
 Blackfoot Chiefs
 Chestermere Lakers
 Northwest Warriors Wolf Pack 
 McKnight Mustangs 
 Simons Valley Storm
 Southside Thunder
 Southwest
 Springbank Rockies
 Trails West Wolves

Champions

Former/Inactive teams 
 McKnight Mustangs (inactive 2017-18 season)
 Seven Clubs
 Saints (inactive 2016-17 season)
Midnapore/Lake Bonivista merge 2019/2020

See also 
Hockey Canada
Hockey Alberta
Calgary Junior Hockey League
Alberta Junior Hockey League
Western Hockey League
Ice hockey in Calgary

References

External links
Hockey Calgary website

Hockey Alberta
Ice hockey in Calgary
Cal